William S. Cutler (February 7, 1920 – March 24, 2012) served as the Pacific Coast League president from 1979 to 1997. He was inducted into the Pacific Coast League Hall of Fame in 2005. He was born in Grand Rapids, Michigan.

Prior to serving as president of the PCL, Cutler worked as an administrative assistant to Will Harridge. (In the famous video of Willie Mays' catch of Vic Wertz's fly ball in the 1954 World Series which then cuts back to fans in the stands, Cutler is seated next to the man who puts his hand to his forehead in disbelief.)  He then worked as an assistant general manager and vice-president to Charlie Finley, although mostly in name only. After that, he worked as a scout for the Montreal Expos, and he eventually became owner of the Portland Beavers. He moved the team to Spokane, Washington in 1973.

Cutler is related to former minor leaguers Charles Bordes and Brett Bordes and former big leaguer Jack Heidemann.

He died on March 24, 2012 in Mesa, Arizona.

References

1920 births
2012 deaths
Baseball executives
Minor league baseball executives
Montreal Expos scouts
Oakland Athletics executives
Pacific Coast League
Sportspeople from Grand Rapids, Michigan